Bohren & der Club of Gore is a German ambient/jazz band from Nordrhein-Westfalen, Germany.

History
The band was founded in 1992 in Mülheim an der Ruhr, Germany by Thorsten Benning, Morten Gass, Robin Rodenberg and Reiner Henseleit. Originally, group members started out playing in various hardcore punk bands such as 7 Inch Boots and Chronical Diarrhoea. In 1992 they produced a crossover of jazz and ambient, which they self-described as an "unholy ambient mixture of slow jazz ballads, Black Sabbath doom and down-tuned Autopsy sounds". Henseleit left the band in 1996 and was replaced by Christoph Clöser in 1997, replacing the guitar with a saxophone at the same time.

Members
 Morten Gass – organ, synthesizer, mellotron, Fender Rhodes electric piano, 8-string bass, vocoder (1992-present)
 Robin Rodenberg – bass guitar, double bass (1992-present)
 Christoph Clöser – saxophones, piano, Fender Rhodes electric piano, vibraphone (1997-present)

Former members
 Reiner Henseleit – electric guitars (1992-1996)
 Thorsten Benning – drums (1992-2015)

Discography

Albums
 Gore Motel (1994)
 Midnight Radio (1995)
 Sunset Mission (2000)
 Black Earth (2002)
 Geisterfaust (2005)
 Dolores (2008)
 Piano Nights (2014)
 Patchouli Blue (2020)

Compilation albums
 Bohren for Beginners (2016)
 "Plateau" on The Others (Lustmord remix/covers album, 2022)

EPs
 Bohren & der Club of Gore (1994)
 Schwarzer Sabbat Für Dean Martin (1994)
 Mitleid Lady (2010)
 Beileid (2011)

Demos
 Langspielkassette (as Bohren) (1992)
 Luder, Samba und Tavernen (1993)

See also 
List of ambient music artists

References

External links
 Official site
 Bohren & der Club of Gore discography at MusicBrainz
 Bohren & der Club of Gore discography at Discogs

German jazz ensembles
Dark ambient music groups
PIAS Recordings artists
Ipecac Recordings artists